Te Awamutu was a temporary terminus, serving the border town of Te Awamutu, on the North Island Main Trunk (NIMT) in New Zealand from 1880, when the line was extended from Ōhaupō, until 1887, when the line was extended south to Ōtorohanga.

History

Location 
A public meeting in 1878 supported a town centre site, but 6 months later, Goodfellow's paddock was chosen. Sir George Grey claimed that the station was so far from the town due to opposition from local residents, though another source described them as, "interested landed proprietors". In 1879 Rangiaohia Road Board asked for £750 to build the link road and footpaths, which were finished in 1880.

Construction 

The  extension from Ōhaupō was built for £25,972 by Daniel Fallon, who also built the Mercer to Ngāruawāhia section of the NIMT. Work started in 1878. On Wednesday, 19 May 1880 a test train, of two engines and 29 wagons of stone, reached Te Awamutu. The line was opened on Thursday, 1 July 1880, initially with one train a day, after £352 had been spent moving Ōhaupō's engine shed and building cattle pens. In 1881 another £45 was spent to move the engine driver's cottage. Other houses were bought or built in 1885, 1954 and 1955.

Extension 
Surveying to extend the railway  from Te Awamutu to Ōtorohanga was started in 1883 by Charles Wilson Hursthouse. The first sod ceremony was performed at the Puniu River on 15 April 1885. Trains were working through to Ōtorohanga by January 1887, and the extension opened on 6, or 8 March 1887, though the line wasn't handed over from the Public Works Department to the Railways Department (NZR) until Wednesday 9 March.

Original station 
By 1884 Te Awamutu had a 4th class station, platform, cart approach, a  x  goods shed, loading bank, cattle yards, water service, coal accommodation, engine shed, stationmaster's house, urinals and a passing loop for 37 wagons (extended to 55 by 1911 and 71 by 1980). A turntable was added in 1901, additions were made to the station in 1908, by 1911 there were sheep yards and fixed signals and in 1921 electric lighting was added. The 1902 edition of The Cyclopedia of New Zealand described the station as, "of wood and iron, and contains a public vestibule and waiting room, ladies' waiting room, and general office. It has also a long passenger platform and a convenient goods shed. The stationmaster is assisted by a junior porter and a guard, and two gangers are resident in Te Awamutu."

1958 station 
In 1987 there was also a goods shed and shed for a shunting tractor. In 1943 there was a Royal New Zealand Air Force siding and in 1980 Dibble Brothers had a private siding for their fertiliser.

Services 
Trains calling at Te Awamutu included The Overlander, Blue Streak, Scenic Daylight, Daylight Limited, Northerner and Night Limited.

The station buildings were demolished in 2001 and replaced by a shelter until the station closed in 2005. New Zealand Dairy Board (now Fonterra) rebuilt its freight connection about 2000.

Since 2005 there has been a large flow from the dairy factory to Crawford St depot in Hamilton.

There are still hopes that passenger services may resume. For example, in 2015, Waipa District Council said, "it is important to preserve the rail platform facilities and infrastructure in Te Awamutu to enable future passenger rail connections between Te Awamutu and Hamilton". In 2021 it was agreed to remove the shelter due to vandalism.

Patronage 
As shown in the table and graph below, passenger numbers peaked in 1921 and again in 1944 -

References

External links 
 2010 Google street view of remains of Te Awamutu station
 Location on 1:50,000 map
 NZ Museums photo
Photo of train at station in 1908
 Photo of coaches meeting a train 02 DECEMBER 1909
 Photos of derelict station shortly before demolition
 Photo of station in 1966

Defunct railway stations in New Zealand
railway station
Railway stations opened in 1880
Railway stations closed in 2005
Rail transport in Waikato
Buildings and structures in Waikato